Dartmouth Peak is a peak  high, standing  east-northeast of Mount McClintock in the central part of the Britannia Range. It was named by the Advisory Committee on Antarctic Names in association with HMS Britannia after the seaport of Dartmouth, Devon, England, on the west bank of the River Dart estuary. From 1863 until 1905, British naval cadets (including some officers of R.F. Scott's British National Antarctic Expedition, 1901–04, received Royal Navy officer training in HMS Britannia, then berthed at Dartmouth.

References 

Mountains of Oates Land
Britannia Range (Antarctica)